Jane MacRae is a Canadian film and television editor. She is most noted for her work on the 2019 film The Cuban, for which she received a Canadian Screen Award nomination for Best Editing at the 9th Canadian Screen Awards in 2021.

Her other credits have included the films Blood Hunters and 22 Chaser, and the television series Endlings, Odd Squad, Dino Dana and Lockdown.

References

External links

Canadian film editors
Canadian television editors
Canadian women film editors
Canadian Film Centre alumni
Living people
Year of birth missing (living people)